Cash Out is an upcoming American action film directed by Randall Emmett and starring John Travolta.

Cast
John Travolta as Mason Goddard
Kristin Davis as Amelia Deckard
Quavo as Anton
Lukas Haas as Shawn Goddard 
Swen Temmel
Sean Astin
Noel Gugliemi as Hector

Production
Filming occurred in Columbus, Georgia in June 2022.

References

External links
 

Upcoming films
Films shot in Georgia (U.S. state)